The following is a list of United States′s attacks on forces belonging to, or allied with the Syrian government during the Syrian Civil War. Other than the April 2017 Shayrat missile strike and the April 2018 missile strikes, all other attacks were officially announced by the Pentagon as having been carried out in defense of either the Syrian Democratic Forces or the Revolutionary Commando Army in Al-Tanf.

The United States claimed that some attacks were accidental, such as the September 2016 Deir ez-Zor air raid, which killed 50 Syrian Army and allied troops.

List of attacks

Intentional attacks

Other attacks

References

United States attacks
American involvement in the Syrian civil war

2017 in the Syrian civil war
2018 in the Syrian civil war
Syria–United States relations